Sami Al Lenqawi (1 June 1972 – 30 November 1997) was a Kuwaiti football defender who played for the Kuwait national football team in the 1996 Asian Cup. He also played for Al Arabi and competed in the men's tournament at the 1992 Summer Olympics.

References

External links

Kuwaiti footballers
Place of birth missing
1972 births
1997 deaths
Association football defenders
Olympic footballers of Kuwait
Footballers at the 1992 Summer Olympics
Al-Arabi SC (Kuwait) players
Kuwait Premier League players
Kuwaiti people of Iranian descent